PPT Namenska is a Serbian manufacturer of arms, mortars, grenade launchers, unmanned ground vehicle, hydraulics and pneumatics, airplane parts and some complex weapons system including modernized M-77 Oganj, PASARS-16, and LRSVM Morava in various stages of production. There is also a production for civil and industries users.

Its headquarters and main production facilities are located in the town of Trstenik.

History

Foundation
"Prva Petoletka Trstenik" (PPT) was founded on 23 March 1949, by the Government of People's Federal Republic of Yugoslavia, at the beginning of the first five-year plan of development, after which it was named. It was planned to manufacture combat and training aircraft. But Josip Tito ordered in 1949 that about 150 most advanced factories and their production to be moved from Serbia to Bosnia and Herzegovina, Croatia and Slovenia under a pretext of a Soviet invasion that never occurred. Thus Prva Petoletka never produced a complete aircraft but only parts such as hydraulics and landing gears.

The Government of Serbia invested 3.5 million euros in factory's modernization in 2017, for the needs of defense industry.

Organization
Since 2008 PPT Namenska is separate legal entity and operates under government control as part of Defense industry of Serbia. In 2017, a modernization program was started and new machines for production are obtained.

Products

Military
 PASARS-16
 Mali Miloš
 Mortars
 Grenade launchers 
 Parts for Soko J-22 Orao, Soko G-4 Super Galeb, and Utva Lasta

Civil industries
 Injection molding machines
 Blow molding machines
 Labeling machines
 Filling machines
 Linear capping machines
 Hydraulic operating cylinders
 Servo actuators
 Valves
 Hydraulic and other pumps

See also
 Defence industry of Serbia

References

Companies based in Trstenik
Manufacturing companies established in 1999
Defense companies of Serbia
Defense industry of Serbia
Serbian companies established in 1999